Mein Leben (German, 'My Life') may refer to:

Autobiographies

 August Heinrich Hoffmann von Fallersleben (1868)
 Mein Leben (Wagner), Richard Wagner (1880)
 Johann Gottfried Seume (1899)
 Leo Königsberger (1919)
 Paul von Hindenburg (1920)
 Wilhelm von Bode (1930)
 Friedrich Griese (1934)
 Hermann Eris Busse (1935)
 Simon Dubnow (1937)
 Adele Sandrock (1940)
 Erich Raeder (1956)
 Alma Mahler (1963)	
 Otto Hahn (1968)
 Oskar Kokoschka (1972)	
 Marcel Reich-Ranicki (2003) (English title The Author of Himself: The Life of Marcel Reich-Ranicki)

Other uses
Mein Leben (TV series), a series of biographical documentaries from French/German TV network Arte